Myung Joon-jae (born 2 July 1994) is a South Korean footballer who plays as a midfielder for Gimcheon Sangmu.

Career
Myung joined Jeonbuk Hyundai Motors in 2016. On 26 December 2016, he was loaned to the K League Challenge side Seoul E-Land.

References

External links
 
 

1994 births
Living people
South Korean footballers
South Korea under-23 international footballers
Association football midfielders
Jeonbuk Hyundai Motors players
Seoul E-Land FC players
K League 2 players
Korea University alumni